Arnold Johan Messenius (1607 – 22 December 1651) was a Swedish enfant terrible and royal historiographer who was condemned to death and executed under the reign of Queen Christina.

Early life
Arnold was born at Gdańsk, the son of the historian Johannes Messenius and Lucia Grothusen, daughter of Arnold Grothusen. The Grothusens were members of the old Livonian nobility. Arnold Johan spent much of his youth in the fortress of Kajaneborg in Arctic Finland, where his father had been imprisoned on suspicion of being a Catholic and collaborating with the king of Poland Sigismund III Vasa and the Jesuits.

His father was sentenced to death in July 1616, but the king changed the sentence to prison, probably for life. During his imprisonment, Johannes Messenius wrote the Scandia illustrata, a history of the Nordic countries in 14 volumes. The work  treated Sweden's history from the Genesis flood narrative to Messenius' own time. When Messenius suspected that the government wanted to publish this work in its own name, he demanded freedom for his son, Arnold, who was also imprisoned, and free passage for himself to wherever he wished. Shortly after Johannes Messenius died, the government offered his widow, Lucia Grothusen, 500 Swedish riksdaler for Scandia illustrata. However, she left the kingdom with the manuscripts.

Arnold had a restless adolescence. In 1621, at the age of 14, the Swedish authorities locked him up in Uppsala in a boarding school run by Lutherans. He was forced to flee in 1623 after being accused of what seems to be the accidental killing of a classmate during a dispute. After an adventurous escape through Norway and Denmark, he arrived in Gdańsk, Poland where he was welcomed by his mother's family.

In October 1623 he was accepted at the prestigious Jesuit Collegium Hosianum in Braunsberg (Poland), where his father also had studied, but, undisciplined, he left shortly afterwards. After wandering in Prussia, Poland, Silesia, Bohemia and Austria, he returned to Sweden in July 1624 in the wake of Krzysztof Radziwiłł, a noble Lithuanian Protestant and opponent of Gustav II Adolf of Sweden.

In Sweden, at the age of about 17, he was brought to trial on charges of spying for Poland. The process, during which he was accused of defending his father, ended with the death sentence of Arnold Johan, as a traitor. He was pardoned by King Gustav II Adolf and in 1626 sent to Kexholm as a prisoner.

Career
He was pardoned 14 years later, in 1640 through Count Per Brahe, the governor of Swedish Finland. He then went to Stockholm to obtain employment in government service.

In August 1640, Messenius was arrested at the Danish border and put in Stockholm jail. The councils instructed him to go to Poland and find the manuscript Scandia illustrata, left there by his mother after his father's death. Messenius was able to fulfill this mission, and found a number of curious Swedish documents. Arnold Johan was instructed to write an official history of Sigismund and Charles IX's reign and won the generous patronage of the admiral Carl Carlsson Gyllenhielm.

In 1645 he was appointed royal historian by Queen Christina, and raised to the peerage. However, he had not the talent of his father for history, nor his critical instinct, nor the qualities of perseverance and willingness to do hard work. When Christina ordered him, after a scandal, to supply his sister with some of his fiefs, their animosity began.

Subsequently, in 1649 and 1650 he made connections with opposition leaders known as the "Messen conspiracy", and Swedish noblemen were alarmed.

Death
Messenius wrote some satires on Axel Oxenstierna and accused Christina of serious misbehavior and being a Jezebel, for which he was beheaded in Stockholm, together with his 17-year-old son.

References 

17th-century Swedish historians
Swedish satirists
Writers from Gdańsk
1607 births
1651 deaths
People executed by Sweden by decapitation
17th-century executions by Sweden
17th-century Swedish writers
17th-century male writers
Executed Swedish people
People of the Swedish Empire
Christina, Queen of Sweden